The 2011 AFC Cup Final was a football match which was played on Saturday, 29 October 2011, to determine the champion of the 2011 AFC Cup. It was the final of the 8th edition of the AFC Cup, a competition organized by the Asian Football Confederation (AFC) for clubs from "developing countries" in Asia.

Nasaf Qarshi became the first Uzbekistan team to win the AFC Cup with a 2–1 win over Al-Kuwait from Kuwait.

Venue
The AFC decided that the final would be hosted by one of the finalists. This format is the same as the 2009 and 2010 editions. On 7 June 2011, the draw for the quarter-finals, semi-finals and final was made. For the final, the winner of semi-final 1 (played between the winners of quarter-finals 2 and 4) would be the home team, while the winner of semi-final 2 (played between the winners of quarter-finals 1 and 3) would be the away team. Therefore Nasaf Qarshi were the home team, and Al-Kuwait were the away team.

Road to final

Match details

See also
2011 AFC Cup

References

External links
AFC Cup Official Page 

Final
AFC Cup finals
International club association football competitions hosted by Uzbekistan